This is a list of the 8 baseball players from the Bahamas who played in Major League Baseball between 1957 and 2022.

Players

References
Players born in Bahamas - Baseball-Reference.com.

Bahamas